The following is a list of footballers who have represented Palau in senior international matches.

Key

Players 
List is incomplete as of 23 December 2022.

References

Association football player non-biographical articles
Lists of association football players by national team